Weaving Room of Crossnore School, also known as Home Spun House, is a historic school building located at Crossnore, Avery County, North Carolina. It was built in 1936, and is a -story, banked, vaguely Rustic Revival-style building constructed of randomly mortared river rock. It was built to house the weaving program of the Crossnore School, an orphanage with an industrial and vocational training program.

It was listed on the National Register of Historic Places in 2001.

The building is now home to the Crossnore Weavers and Crossnore Fine Arts Gallery, a fine art gallery, weaving studio with museum exhibits, and retail shop that benefits that Crossnore School, a private children's home.

References

External links
 Crossnore Weavers
 Crossnore Fine Arts Gallery

School buildings on the National Register of Historic Places in North Carolina
School buildings completed in 1936
Schools in Avery County, North Carolina
National Register of Historic Places in Avery County, North Carolina
Museums in Avery County, North Carolina
Art museums and galleries in North Carolina
Textile museums in the United States
Individually listed contributing properties to historic districts on the National Register in North Carolina